
Caitlin McDougall is an Australian actress who is best known for her roles in the television series Always Greener  and The Alice.

Early life and education
McDougall was born in Melbourne, Victoria, and grew up in regional South Australia.

She graduated from the Western Australian Academy of Performing Arts in 1992.

Career
McDougall worked in theatre, for the Melbourne Theatre Company; the Australian Shakespeare Company in Melbourne, Adelaide and Sydney; and has performed comedy in the Melbourne Comedy Festival and Sydney Fringe.

McDougall has appeared in the feature films Hey Hey It's Esther Blueburger (2008) and Ned, and the short comedy film You Better Watch Out (2008).

Her television roles have included Always Greener (2001-3), The Alice (2005–2006), All Saints, Neighbours, A Country Practice, Ocean Girl, Newlyweds and Xena: Warrior Princess.

Personal life
McDougall has been married to actor Erik Thomson since 1999, and they have a daughter called Eilish and a son named Magnus. She co-starred with Thomson in the Australian drama series The Alice.

 they live at Port Willunga, South Australia.

References

External links 

Australian television actresses
Living people
Year of birth missing (living people)